Luan Peres Petroni (born 19 July 1994), known as Luan Peres, is a Brazilian professional footballer who plays for Süper Lig club Fenerbahçe. Mainly a centre-back, he can also play as a left-back.

Career

Portuguesa
Born in São Paulo, Luan Peres began his career on Portuguesa, being promoted to the main squad in July 2013, as a backup to Rogério. He alternated between the first-team and the under-20s in the following years, being named on the bench for the club's last matches of 2014 Série B, but remaining an unused substitute as his side suffered relegation.

After being included in the 28-man list for the 2015 Campeonato Paulista, Luan Peres made his professional debut on 8 April, starting in a 3–0 away loss against São Paulo. On 24 August, after becoming a regular starter during the club's Série C campaign, he signed a new contract until July 2018.

Luan Peres scored his first senior goal on 16 February 2016, in a 2–1 Campeonato Paulista Série A2 home defeat of Velo Clube. In June, he rescinded his contract with Lusa, after having unpaid wages.

Santa Cruz / Red Bull Brasil
On 21 June 2016, Luan Peres signed a short-term deal with Série A club Santa Cruz. He made his debut in the top tier on 31 July, starting in a 3–0 loss at Atlético Mineiro.

Luan Peres contributed with 14 appearances (13 starts), as Santa suffered relegation. Ahead of the 2017 Campeonato Paulista, he signed for Red Bull Brasil, being a regular starter as his club narrowly avoided relegation.

Ponte Preta
On 10 May 2017, Luan Peres was announced at Ituano, but joined Ponte Preta on loan until December just two days later. Initially a backup to Marllon and Rodrigo, he remained at the club in the following year and subsequently became a first-choice.

Fluminense
On 20 April 2018, Luan Peres agreed to a one-year loan deal at Fluminense. He immediately became a starter under manager Abel Braga, but rescinded his contract with the club on 20 June after accepting an offer from a Belgian club.

Club Brugge
On 1 July 2018 Belgian First Division A side Club Brugge reached and agreement with Ituano for the transfer of Luan Peres, who signed a four-year contract with the club. He made his debut abroad on 5 August, replacing Jelle Vossen in a 1–0 away defeat of Royal Excel Mouscron.

Luan Peres made his UEFA Champions League debut on 11 December 2018, replacing Cyril Ngonge in a 0–0 home draw against Atlético Madrid.

Santos
On 3 August 2019, Luan Peres returned to his home country after agreeing to a loan deal with Santos, until December 2020. He made his debut for the club on 14 September, starting in a 1–0 away loss against Flamengo.

Initially a backup to Gustavo Henrique and Lucas Veríssimo, Luan Peres became a regular starter after the former moved to Flamengo. On 29 December 2020, his loan was extended until the end of the 2020 Copa Libertadores; the extension also added an obligatory buyout clause if his team reach the Final of the competition.

Luan Peres' permanent four-year contract with Peixe was registered on 12 February 2021.

Marseille

On 14 July 2021, Luan Peres signed a four-year deal with French Ligue 1 side Marseille. He played 43 games during the season, where he was on the pitch 69,11% percent overall.

Fenerbahçe 
On 29 July 2022, Luan Peres signed for Süper Lig club Fenerbahçe on a three-year contract.

Career statistics

Honours
Club Brugge
Belgian Super Cup: 2018

References

External links
 
 
 

1994 births
Living people
Footballers from São Paulo
Brazilian footballers
Association football defenders
Campeonato Brasileiro Série A players
Campeonato Brasileiro Série C players
Associação Portuguesa de Desportos players
Santa Cruz Futebol Clube players
Red Bull Brasil players
Ituano FC players
Associação Atlética Ponte Preta players
Fluminense FC players
Santos FC players
Belgian Pro League players
Club Brugge KV players
Ligue 1 players
Olympique de Marseille players
Fenerbahçe S.K. footballers
Brazilian expatriate footballers
Brazilian expatriate sportspeople in Belgium
Brazilian expatriate sportspeople in France
Expatriate footballers in Belgium
Expatriate footballers in France
Expatriate footballers in Turkey
Brazilian expatriate sportspeople in Turkey